"Death of a Salesman" is a television play episode of the BBC One anthology television series Play of the Month, based on the 1949 play of the same name by Arthur Miller. It was directed by Alan Cooke, starred Rod Steiger as Willy Loman. and originally aired on 24 May 1966

The production gained two BAFTA nominations. Despite this, a recording does not seem to have survived.

Cast
 Rod Steiger as Willy Loman
 Betsy Blair as Linda
 Joss Ackland as Charley
 Tony Bill as Biff
 Kenneth J. Warren as Uncle Ben
 Brian Davies as Happy
 Clive Endersby as Bernard
 David Healy as Edward Wagner
 Marc Farren as Stanley
 Diana Ashley as Miss Forsythe
 Lyndel Rowe as Letta
 Marcella Markham as Woman

References

External links
 

1966 television plays
BBC television dramas
Lost BBC episodes
Lost television episodes
Play of the Month